Billy is an American sitcom and a spin-off of Head of the Class that aired on ABC for half a season from January 31 to May 30, 1992. The series starred Billy Connolly as Billy MacGregor, a Scottish teacher who moves to America in order to build a new life for himself.

Synopsis
Following the end of Head of the Class, Billy moves to Berkeley, California after Filmore High School was closed down, where he marries Mary Springer (played by Marie Marshall), a single mom with several children, so he could get his green card. The marriage is arranged in order to prevent Billy from being deported back to the UK. Billy becomes Mary's boarder, living in her basement apartment with the strictest of rules: no drinking, no smoking, no pets, and no sex.

The series follows Billy's misadventures as he adjusts to life in California while staying one step ahead of immigration officials seeking to prove his marriage is a sham. Meanwhile, his relationship with Mary's children, 14-year-old David, 10-year-old Laura and 5-year-old Annie, (played by Johnny Galecki, Natanya Ross, and Clara Bryant) deepens to a parental level, and Billy and Mary likewise find themselves drawing closer together, although the series was cancelled before this subplot could be carried out.

Cast
Billy Connolly as Billy MacGregor
Marie Marshall as Mary Springer MacGregor
Johnny Galecki as David MacGregor
Natanya Ross as Laura MacGregor
Clara Bryant as Annie MacGregor

Scheduling and cancellation
Billy premiered as part of ABC's TGIF lineup, Fridays at 9:30/8:30c. After two months in this time period, the show moved to Saturday night (just one week after ABC abruptly ended the failed TGIF sister lineup, I Love Saturday Night), at 8:30/7:30c. While on Saturdays, the program would switch time slots a few more times, but none of the moves produced better ratings; Billy folded after one season.

Episodes

References
 
 Tim Brooks and Earle Marsh, The Complete Directory to Prime Time Network and Cable TV Shows 1946–Present 
TV Guide Guide to TV (2006)

External links
 

1992 American television series debuts
1992 American television series endings
1990s American sitcoms
American Broadcasting Company original programming
English-language television shows
Television series by Warner Bros. Television Studios
Television shows set in Berkeley, California
American television spin-offs
TGIF (TV programming block)